The Workers' Institute of Marxism–Leninism–Mao Zedong Thought (spelled Tsetung until 1979) was a small Maoist political organisation and cult based in Brixton, London.  It was formed by Aravindan Balakrishnan in 1974 after his expulsion from the Communist Party of England (Marxist-Leninist). Many of its members lived in a commune originally based at its headquarters. In the early 1980s, after a police raid, Balakrishnan decided to move the group’s activities underground.

Balakrishnan's control over his followers intensified and the commune moved between several addresses. The group ended in 2013 with the arrest of Balakrishnan and his wife, Chandra, under the suspicion of multiple charges including rape, false imprisonment, and domestic abuse. The three remaining members were taken to safety, including Katy Morgan-Davies who was born into the sect.

History
The Workers' Institute of Marxism-Leninism-Mao Tsetung Thought was formed by Aravindan Balakrishnan in 1974 after his expulsion from the Communist Party of England (Marxist-Leninist). The Workers' Institute began publishing the South London Workers' Bulletin from a south London squat, aiming to build a "red base" in Brixton and encourage the Chinese People's Liberation Army (PLA) to liberate the area.

Their headquarters in Acre Lane, Brixton, known as the Mao Zedong Memorial Centre, opened in October 1976. The centre was a commune which housed thirteen people. Other members lived nearby in co-housing. Members were expected to give a share of their earning to the group.

The group came to broader attention when the diarist in The Times in April 1977 reported some of the group's material as an amusing aside. The Workers' Institute claimed affiliation to the Communist Party of China. A document by the group issued in 1977 argued that the British population was moving in a "revolutionary direction". The document asserted that the opening of the group’s headquarters "has taken the British fascist state by storm". Balakrishnan prophesied that the PLA would have launched a revolutionary invasion of Britain by 1980.

The headquarters was monitored by the police. In March 1978, it was raided under suspicion of drug offences. No drugs were found but at least nine were arrested for assaulting police officers, including Balakrishnan. The centre was closed down after the raid. At the trial those charged refused to accept the authority of the court and they were sent to jail for a brief period.

After his release Balakrishnan decided to take the group’s activities underground. In 1980, the group consisted of Balakrishnan and seven female followers.

The group lived together at various locations around south London. The group house was visited in 1997 by a news organisation seeking an interview which was refused.

Arrest and charges
In 2013, the arrest of Balakrishnan and wife Chandra for suspicion of enslavement and domestic abuse marked the end of the group. The trial has become known as the Lambeth slavery case. After the arrest the three remaining women, Katy Morgan-Davies (Balakrishnan's daughter), Aisha Wahab and Josie Herivel were taken to safety.

Balakrishnan was charged with several offences on 11 December 2014. No further legal action is to be taken against his wife. The hearings for the case began in November 2015. On 4 December 2015 he was found guilty of a string of sex assaults (including rape), child cruelty and false imprisonment. Balakrishnan was sentenced to 23 years in prison by the Southwark crown court on 29 January 2016.

Criticism
Steve Rayner in his 1979 paper The Classification and Dynamics of Sectarian Forms of Organisation found the group to be millenarian and incapable of critical debate, noting that "disagreement is not merely driven underground but actually goes unrecognised in the interests of group solidarity and an extreme ideology of equality."

Robert Griffiths, general secretary of the Communist Party of Britain, said of the group in November 2013: "if one were to be brutally honest they were more of psychiatric interest than political interest. They had nothing to do with the mainstream leftwing and communist politics of the day."

Organisation
In 1979, Steve Rayner claimed the group practised democratic centralism.

References

Bibliography
Peter Barberis, John McHugh and Mike Tyldesley, Encyclopedia of British and Irish Political Organizations, Pinter, 2000,  p. 169.

External links
Workers' Institute of Marxism–Leninism–Mao Zedong Thought archive on Marxists Internet Archive

Defunct communist parties in England
Maoist organisations in the United Kingdom
Defunct Maoist parties
Political parties established in 1974
Cults